Kitahimbwa (or Yosia, 1869–1902)  was Omukama of Bunyoro from 1898 to 1902 in Bunyoro nowadays Uganda.

Kitahimbwa became king when his father Kabalega of Bunyoro was exiled to Seychelles. But his government was mainly under British administration.

References and external links 

 rulers.org/rulu Uganda at rulers.org

Ugandan monarchies
1853 births
1923 deaths